Rabí or Rábí is a ruined castle in the Plzeň Region of the Czech Republic. It is the largest castle (in terms of area) in te country.

Rabí Castle was proclaimed a national cultural monument in 1978.

Etymology
The name of the castle might derive from the German word raben ("raven"), or it could be mangled Czech name  ("sparrow's peak").

Location
Rabí is located on a prominent hill by the central course of the Otava River, in the foothills of Bohemian Forest Foothills,  from Prague.

History
The first mention of Rabí Castle dates from 1380, although it is not known exactly when it was founded. It is likely that the Lords of Velhartice established it after 1300 to protect trade routes along the Otava and also to inspect gold-bearing deposits in it. They built a strong palace, ramparts and a keep. Subsequent owners, the Švihovský of Rýzmburk family, continued  building work and built the outer ward and two square towers.

At the start of the Hussite rebellions, the Švihovský family searched for havens of supporters of the Catholic side in the district and for their treasures, at Rabí. In 1420–1421, the Hussites conquered the castle twice, and legend has it that during the second siege an arrow fired from crossbow hit the trunk of a pear tree and a resulting splinter from the tree hit Jan Žižka in his only good eye. In 1479, the provincial governor Půta Švihovský of Rýzmberk became the owner of the estate and began with a thoughtful remodelling of the castle under the guidance of famous master Benedict Rejt. New living quarters and service buildings were constructed, the castle was enlarged and the fortifications heightened.

Rabí Castle was, from the very start, envisioned as a donjon-type castle. It was built in the form of three separate sections, constructed in tiers above each other. However, building activity exhausted the Švihovský family's finances and the fortifications remained incomplete.

Many alchemical experiences took place during Půta's time as well; a German alchemist who failed to transform lead into gold was then imprisoned in the castle's massive prismatic tower. Půta had three nannies walled-in alive for turning his wife against his brothers. His son later sold the estate in 1549, but the new owners did not invest in the castle. Instead they made use exclusively of the existing original buildings. The following owners, the House of Chanov, from Dlouhá Ves, bought the castle in 1570.

The slowly deteriorating complex was completely devastated during the Thirty Years' War, when Mansfeld's soldiers went on the rampage. Emperor Ferdinand III ordered that the castle should have been destroyed after 1650. In the end it was saved, but on the condition that it was not to be repaired. In time it became a source of building material for local peasants.

The last owners, the Lamberk family (from 1708) donated the castle to the Horažďovice Society for the Preservation of Artistic, Cultural and Natural Monuments for a symbolic price of 1 CSK in 1920, and after 1945 it was taken by the Czechoslovak State.

See also
 Horažďovice
 Radyně Castle

Notes

References

External links

Sušice Brána Šumavy Panoramic views of Rabí Castle

Klatovy District
Castles in the Plzeň Region
National Cultural Monuments of the Czech Republic
Ruined castles in the Czech Republic